The girls' 7.5 km pursuit biathlon competition at the 2016 Winter Youth Olympics was held on 15 February at the Birkebeineren Ski Stadium.

Results
The race was started at 13:15.

References

Biathlon at the 2016 Winter Youth Olympics